Eduardo Brito is a Santo Domingo Metro station on Line 2. It was open on 1 April 2013 as the eastern terminus of the inaugural section of Line 2 between María Montez and Eduardo Brito. On 9 August 2018 the line was extended further east to Concepción Bona. The station is located between Manuel de Jesús Galván and Ercilia Pepin.

This is an underground station built below Expreso V Centenario. It is named in honor of Eduardo Brito.

References

Santo Domingo Metro stations
2013 establishments in the Dominican Republic
Railway stations opened in 2013